Gambit is a 2012 indie comedy crime film directed by Michael Hoffman, starring Colin Firth, Cameron Diaz, Alan Rickman and Stanley Tucci. It is a remake of the 1966 film of the same name starring Shirley MacLaine and Michael Caine. This version is written by Joel and Ethan Coen. The film premiered in the UK on 21 November 2012; it never received a theatrical release in the US, despite originally being planned for a 12 October 2012 release, and went straight-to-DVD on 25 April 2014.

Plot 
British art curator Harry Deane decides to seek revenge on his abusive boss Lord Lionel Shabandar conning him into buying a fake Monet (Haystacks at Dusk), to complement the one he already has (Haystacks at Dawn). He teams up with a master art forger, the Major, and travels to Alpine, Texas. He searches for rodeo queen PJ Puznowski, the granddaughter of the sergeant responsible for capturing Hermann Göring in 1945. 

Harry explains that PJ's participation will lend authenticity since the Monet was last seen at Carinhall after being plundered by the Nazis. She agrees and the next day the three drive out to PJ's grandmother's mobile home out in the desert. They hang the fake Monet on the wall and take a picture with the painting in the background. The picture is to appear with an article on the rodeo queen that will be published in a magazine that is part of Shabandar's media empire.

Back in London, Harry meets with Shabandar and discusses the photos of PJ and her grandmother, turning the attention to the painting. Shabandar replies that it is a reproduction, based on the fact that it is hanging on the wall of a mobile home in Texas. Harry suggests that they at least check to see if the painting is real or not, because the painting is so rarely reproduced. Shabandar reluctantly agrees, and Harry tries to find PJ to follow up on the matter. 

PJ offers the painting to Shabandar for £12 million, but only after arranging to meet him at the Savoy Hotel, which Harry can barely afford. His frustration with PJ grows after she accepts romantic advances from Shabandar. While they are alone, Shabandar tells her that art curator Martin Zaidenweber will replace Harry. PJ meets Zaidenweber and tells him that the painting has been hanging in her house since she was a little girl. When Shabandar opines that Harry is an idiot, Zaidenweber counters that he is a good man with simply a bad eye for art. Back at the hotel, PJ tells Harry that she no longer wants any part in his plan.

The following night, PJ has dinner with Shabandar again. They are stopped by his rival businessman, Akira Takagawa, who has wanted revenge ever since losing to Shabandar in the 1992 auction for the first Haystacks painting. By the time she leaves, Harry has called Zaidenweber and convinced him to abandon his partnership with Shabandar. 

Meeting Harry in the courtyard, PJ agrees to take part in the plan once more. When they arrive at Shabandar's masquerade ball, Harry heads to the gallery, counting on her to distract Shabandar while he makes final preparations. 

As the inspection is about to begin, Zaidenweber arrives, having lied to Harry and remained loyal to Shabandar. He announces that the painting is real, but suddenly, Harry speaks up and disagrees. To everyone's shock, Harry wipes away paint to reveal the likeness of Queen Elizabeth II underneath. Shabandar announces that PJ will be of no further use to him and tries to re-hire Harry. Harry turns him down, noting his disapproval of the way Shabandar has treated PJ.

Harry and the Major meet with Takagawa and his men. It is revealed that the Major had painted copies for both Dusk and Dawn paintings. Harry had removed the real Dawn painting and switched it with its copy. Takagawa tells Harry that his payment for the real Haystacks at Dawn by Monet, £10 million, has been transferred to his Swiss bank account. Harry and the Major thank Takagawa, and head on their way. 

Meanwhile, while PJ goes through security, she finds a painting from Harry as a gift. She smiles, just before boarding the plane. The end of the film shows Harry and the Major walking through the airport talking about Donald Trump's fascination with Picasso.

Cast 
 Cameron Diaz as PJ Puznowski
Colin Firth as Harry Deane
 Alan Rickman as Lord Lionel Shabandar 
 Tom Courtenay as The Major
 Stanley Tucci as Martin Zaidenweber
 Cloris Leachman as Grandma
 Togo Igawa as Takagawa

Production 
A remake of Gambit had been mooted for several years.  Producer Mike Lobell saw the original film at its London premiere in 1966, and in 1997, Lobell, who was then working at Universal, was looking for a film to remake; he suggested Gambit and Universal approved it. He initially sent the original script to Aaron Sorkin to rewrite it; however, despite being keen to work on the project, the success of Sports Night and more especially The West Wing meant that he couldn't commit to completing the rewrite. After Sorkin pulled out, Lobell met British producer Andy Paterson, director Anand Tucker and writer Frank Cottrell Boyce. Boyce produced a script moving the story to Japan; despite this Lobell didn't think it was funny enough and decided to move on. Hearing that Joel and Ethan Coen were looking for some rewrite work between films, Lobell gave them the script and they produced a "radical overhaul", moving the story to the United States. Despite having the Coen brothers on board the project remained in development hell. Initially, Alexander Payne was in talks to direct it, reuniting with Election star Reese Witherspoon, but was reluctant to work on a script he didn't write.

Witherspoon was willing to remain on the project but only if producer Lobell could get Mike Nichols or Robert Altman to direct. After the success of Gosford Park, Altman was keen to make another film in Britain, especially as Witherspoon was attached. However, prior to signing on, Altman backed out, feeling that the material was not suitable for him. Nichols wasn't interested and the project stalled.

Bo Welch was then attached to the project with Colin Firth starring as Harry Deane, with Jennifer Aniston and Ben Kingsley attached. After the box office failure of Welch's 2003 live action film of Dr Seuss's The Cat in the Hat Universal got cold feet and the project was again put into turnaround. Outside of the studio system Lobell moved between different financiers in a bid to get the project moving. One group, Alcon Entertainment, had Gerard Butler lined up as Harry Deane, with Richard LaGravenese directing. LaGravenese wanted a script polish, which took a long time, removing a lot of the work the Coen Brothers had done. Again the project was stalled.

Speaking in September 2008, Colin Firth was asked about whether he would take the role of Harry Deane, and said, "No! It's a complete lie. It's been on IMDb and just sitting there." He also said: "The Coen brothers have written an absolutely brilliant script." Others reportedly discussed for the remake included Hugh Grant and Sandra Bullock.

The script was well known around Hollywood and in 2009 Lobell took a call from Roeg Sutherland at CAA. Sutherland knew of a fledgling production company, Crime Scene Pictures, with equity financing from Southeast Asia, who were looking for a marquee project for their new company and felt that Gambit would fit the bill. In 2010, Doug Liman was reportedly considering directing the film. Although initially reluctant to take the project, Lobell persuaded Michael Hoffman to helm the film, and filming finally began in London in May 2011.

In February 2011, John Underwood of bestforfilm.com reported that Colin Firth and Cameron Diaz were set to star as art curator Harry Deane and steer roper PJ Puznowski, who conspire to sell a fake work of art to a collector. On May 15, 2011, The Hollywood Reporter reported that Stanley Tucci and Cloris Leachman had joined a cast that also included Alan Rickman and Tom Courtenay. The music is by Rolfe Kent, whose previous films include Up in the Air, Legally Blonde and Sideways.

The Art Gallery at Compton Verney House in South Warwickshire was used for filming some scenes during July 2011. This location is not acknowledged, however, in the film's credits sequence.

Reception
The film received overwhelmingly negative reviews. , the film holds an approval rating of 18% on the review aggregator website Rotten Tomatoes, based on 44 reviews with an average rating of 4.25 out of 10. The website's critics consensus reads: "A curiously charmless caper that squanders a starry cast and screenplay by the Coen brothers, this Gambit doesn't pay off."

The film performed poorly at the box office, grossing only US$1.9 million in its UK run, for a worldwide gross of $14.2 million.

References

External links 
 
 
 

2012 films
2012 independent films
2012 comedy films
American comedy films
British comedy films
Direct-to-video comedy films
Films shot in England
Films set in London
British remakes of American films
Films directed by Michael Hoffman
Films about con artists
Films with screenplays by the Coen brothers
CBS Films films
Films scored by Rolfe Kent
2010s English-language films
2010s American films
2010s British films
American independent films
British independent films